Mordellistena kraatzi is a beetle in the genus Mordellistena of the family Mordellidae. It was described in 1876 by Emery.

References

kraatzi
Beetles described in 1876